Some 250 known manuscripts of Plato survive. The following is a partial list of manuscripts of Plato's dialogues:

Medieval minuscules
 Codex Oxoniensis Clarkianus 39 — 895 AD; first six tetralogies, designated B.
 Codex Parisinus graecus 1807 — circa 900 AD; last two tetralogies and the apocrypha, designated A
 Codex Venetus Marcianus graecus appendix classis 4, I, designated T
 Codex Vindobonensis 54, supplementum phil. Gr. 7, designated W

Papyri

Additional fragments with possibly outdated references
 Papyrus Oxyrhynchus 23 — Laws, fragment
 Papyrus Oxyrhynchus 228 — Laches, fragment
 Papyrus Oxyrhynchus 229 — Phaedo, fragment

Versions
 Nag Hammadi library – Republic 588A–589B, Coptic version

Tetralogies
The traditional division of the works of Plato into tetralogies was done by Thrasyllus of Mendes. The list includes (in italic) works of doubtful authenticity. and includes the Letters. 
1st tetralogy
Euthyphro, Apology, Crito, Phaedo
2nd tetralogy
Cratylus, Theatetus, Sophist, Statesman
3nd tetralogy
Parmenides, Philebus, Symposium, Phaedrus
4th tetralogy
Alcibiades I, Alcibiades II, Hipparchus, Lovers
5th tetralogy
Theages, Charmides, Laches, Lysis
6th tetralogy
Euthydemus, Protagoras, Gorgias, Meno
7th tetralogy
Hippias Major, Hippias Minor, Ion, Menexenus
8th tetralogy
Clitophon, Republic, Timaeus, Critias
9th tetralogy
Minos, Laws, Epinomis, Letters

Notes

Dialogues of Plato
Ancient Greek philosophy-related lists